Sinnamon was an American female R&B vocal trio, consisting of Connecticut natives Barbara Fowler, Marsha Carter, and Melissa Bell from New York City. The group went through an abrupt development from a minimalist contemporary R&B sound of post-disco which was dropped after a third release, moving towards mild freestyle and radio-friendly house music but still preserving their R&B affiliation. Bell is currently a writer, living in New York City.

History
Their greatest success occurred in 1982 when their song "Thanks to You" spent two weeks at number one on the US Hot Dance Music/Club Play chart in Billboard. The song also reached number 44 on the US Billboard R&B chart. Their song "I Need You Now" features uncredited guest vocals by Bernard Fowler from the Peech Boys.

Discography

Singles

See also
List of number-one dance hits (United States)
List of artists who reached number one on the US Dance chart

References

External links
 

Electronic music groups from Connecticut
Electronic music groups from New York (state)
American post-disco music groups
American girl groups
Musical groups established in 1982
Musical groups disestablished in 1994
1982 establishments in the United States
Musical groups from Hartford, Connecticut
American women in electronic music